Thomas Shannon (1910 – 1986) was an English professional rugby league footballer who played in the 1930s and 1940s, and coached in the 1950s. He also appeared for Wigan (Heritage № 440), St Helens (Heritage № 516) and Oldham RLFC (Heritage № 365) as a World War II guest player.

Playing career

International honours
Tommy Shannon won caps for England while at Widnes in 1938 against Wales (2 matches).

Challenge Cup Final appearances
Tommy Shannon played  in Widnes' 5-11 defeat by Hunslet in the 1933–34 Challenge Cup Final during the 1933–34 season at Wembley Stadium, London on Saturday 5 May 1934, and scored a try in the 18-5 victory over Keighley in the 1936–37 Challenge Cup Final during the 1936–37 season at Wembley Stadium, London on Saturday 8 May 1937.

County Cup Final appearances
Tommy Shannon played  in Widnes' 4-5 defeat by Swinton in the 1939–40 Lancashire County Cup Final first-leg during the 1939–40 season at Naughton Park, Widnes on Saturday 20 April 1940, and played  in the 11-16 defeat (15-21 aggregate defeat) by Swinton in the 1939–40 Lancashire County Cup Final second-leg during the 1939–40 season at Station Road, Swinton on Saturday 27 April 1940.

References

External links
Statistics at rugby.widnes.tv
Statistics at wigan.rlfans.com

1910 births
1986 deaths
England national rugby league team players
English rugby league coaches
English rugby league players
Oldham R.L.F.C. players
Rugby league five-eighths
Rugby league players from Widnes
St Helens R.F.C. players
Widnes Vikings coaches
Widnes Vikings players
Wigan Warriors wartime guest players